Willem Pretorius Game Reserve is the largest game reserve in the Lejweleputswa District Municipality of South Africa, encircling the Allemanskraal Dam. The Sand River flows from east to west through the reserve.

Climate 
The reserve receives an annual rainfall of 560 mm on average, mostly falling from December to February during heavy thunderstorms. Frost occurs on 40 nights per year, the average temperature in the winter is 15° C and in the summer the mercury exceeds 30° C often.

Mammals in the reserve

References

Protected areas of the Free State (province)
Nature reserves in South Africa